Gerhard Jan Palthe (21 July 1681 in Denekamp – 30 July 1767 in Deventer), was an 18th-century painter and portraitist from the Northern Netherlands.

Biography
He was the son of a clergyman of the Walloon church. He studied with Jurriaen Pool the younger and also with Gerrit Dou. He worked for a while in Amsterdam, then in Denekamp where he married on 7 October 1714 Lena Leferink, moved to Delden and settled definitely in Deventer.
He was a follower of Godfried Schalcken and made scenes by candlelight. but he is better known for his portraits.

He was the father of 
 Jan
 Adriaan (born 8 September 1718 Deventer, died 12 July 1774 Spaarndam) secretary to count van Wassenaer Obdam. He travelled a lot which enabled him to develop artistic knowledge. He copied a lot of famous paintings and was a crafty amateur
 Anthony (born 17 November 1726 Deventer, died 3 May 1772 Amsterdam) was also a portraitist but after Van Eijnden et Van der Willigen, was not as good as his brother Jan. Living in Amsterdam he set up a wall paper company which was bought two years after his death by Wybrand Hendricks, who also married his widow.

Gerhard Jan Palthe and his son Jan are often mistaken and paintings ill attributed.

References

Gerhard Jan Palthe on Artnet

1681 births
1767 deaths
18th-century Dutch painters
18th-century Dutch male artists
Dutch male painters
People from Denekamp